Jonathan Hellyer is an English singer, theatre director and drag actor best known for his time as the lead singer of Bronski Beat, following the departure John Foster. He is best known for providing vocals for the song, Cha Cha Heels with Eartha Kitt and Bronski Beat, which reached number 32 on the UK charts in 1989.

Career
Hellyer was born on the 27th of September 1967 and began his career as a drag queen and playing roles in theatrical productions. He joined the band, Bronski Beat following the departure of John Foster and he recorded a select few songs with the band. This included a cover of Alicia Keys, I Love The Nightlife and performing vocals with Eartha Kitt on Cha Cha Heels, which was his only minor big hit song with the band in 1989. He stayed with the band until the break up of it in 1994–1995. He also recorded additional material with Bronski Beat which included cover versions of I Love The Nightlife (by Alicia Keys) and I'm Gonna Run Away from You (by Northern Soul). As well as the songs, Better Times and One More Chance.

Hellyer has since performed and composed with artists including Trish O'Brien and the KBL Band. Hellyer is also openly gay and does produce, direct and star in drag shows and also created a show production, called the "Dame Edna Experience".

References

1967 births
20th-century English LGBT people
20th-century English male singers
21st-century English LGBT people
21st-century English male singers
British synth-pop new wave musicians
Bronski Beat members
Gay singers
English LGBT singers
English new wave musicians
English gay musicians
Living people